Bradwardine is a historical location northeast of Virden, Manitoba, in Riverdale Municipality.

The Post Office was founded on 12-12-23W in 1884 and moved to 7-12-22W when the railway arrived about 1902. The name of Rowan was proposed by the first postmaster, John Parr. Ottawa opted for a character from the novel Waverley by Sir Walter Scott, the Baron of Bradwardine.

Once a thriving village, Bradwardine disappeared after the Second World War II. It had suffered losses from two fires in the early 1900s. The railway and the school were both lost after the war.

References 
 Manitoba Historical Society - Historic Sites of Manitoba: Bradwardine (RM of Daly)
 Geographical Names of Manitoba - Bradwardine (page 33) - the Millennium Bureau of Canada

Ghost towns in Manitoba
Unincorporated communities in Westman Region